Topolnitsa is a reservoir in the Sredna Gora mountain, western Bulgaria.

Its construction began in 1948 and was finished in 1963. It was built on the Topolnitsa river just south of the village of Muhovo. The main purpose of the Topolnitsa Dam is to irrigate agricultural lands in the Upper Thracian Plain. The walls of the dam are concrete and are 78 m high. The maximum volume is 137.000.000 m3. There is a small hydro power plant. The catchment area of the dam is 1,381 km² and the annual precipitation in that area is 603 mm.

There are many villas and bungalows around the shores of the dam. It is a good place for fishing with the abundance of carp, rudd, perch and other species of freshwater fish.

External links 
Article on the Topolnitsa Dam on econ.bg (in Bulgarian)
Short information for the Topolnitsa Dam (in Bulgarian)

Reservoirs in Bulgaria
Landforms of Pazardzhik Province
Landforms of Sofia Province